"Take Me to Your Lovin' Place" is a song written by Larry Gatlin, and recorded by American country music group Larry Gatlin & the Gatlin Brothers Band.  It was released in October 1980 as the first single from the album Help Yourself.  They reached number 5 on the Billboard Hot Country Singles & Tracks chart.

Chart performance

References

1981 singles
1980 songs
Larry Gatlin songs
Columbia Records singles
Songs written by Larry Gatlin